Cyrus Shahabi is an Iranian-American computer scientist and a 2003 recipient of the Presidential Early Career Award for Scientists and Engineers.

Biography
Shahabi received his bachelor's degree in computer engineering from the Sharif University of Technology in 1989, followed by a master's degree and PhD in computer science from the University of Southern California (USC) in May 1993 and August 1996 respectively. He currently serves as director of the Integrated Media Systems Center and the Information Laboratory at USC.

Shahabi received an Okawa Foundation Research Grant for Information and Telecommunications in 2001, a National Science Foundation CAREER award in 2002, a Presidential Early Career Award for Scientists and Engineers in 2003, and the Association for Computing Machinery Distinguished Scientist award in 2009. He is a fellow of the Institute of Electrical and Electronics Engineers and is the author or co-author of more than 300 peer-reviewed articles.

Research
Shahabi’s research is in the area of information management. He is mainly known for his contributions to the field of geospatial information management. Under this area, he has made contributions in several subareas, notably: spatial indexing, geospatial information integration, participatory sensing, geo-social environments, location privacy and ride-sharing. Moreover, he pioneered fundamental concepts such as road-network queries, spatial skyline queries and spatial crowdsourcing.  He chaired the founding nomination committee of ACM SIGSPATIAL for its first term (2011-2014 term). He is the chair of the ACM SIGSPATIAL (2017-2020 term).

In addition, Shahabi is responsible (along with Xiaoming Tian and Wugang Zhao) for introducing a new type of tree structure named TSA-tree, based on wavelets. His other work includes the Clustered AGgregation (CAG) algorithm, and the Spatial Skyline Query.

References

Living people
20th-century births
American computer scientists
Sharif University of Technology alumni
University of Southern California alumni
University of Southern California faculty
Year of birth missing (living people)